Stora Huvön is an island in the northwest of the Swedish sector of the Bay of Bothnia, in the Kalix archipelago.

Description

Stora Huvön was voted one of Sweden's most lovely islands in a nationwide poll.
It has a fine, natural harbor protected from most winds, with a sandy beach.
Spruce, pine and birch woods surround the bay. To the north of the bay there is another large sandy beach, good for swimming.

The western part of the island is rocky, and in several places vertical cliff rise straight from the sea.
From the highest point of the island there is a panoramic view of islands in the Kalix and Luleå archipelagos.
A field of shingle extends across the island, made up of small stones polished by glacial action. In some parts they are moss-covered.
There is a small, ancient maze in the center of the shingle field, beside a path that crosses the island.

References

Sources

 

Swedish islands in the Baltic
Islands of Norrbotten County
Kalix